OC Agaza is a Togolese football club based in Lomé. They play in the top division in Togolese football. Their home stadium is Stade Agoè-Nyivé.

Achievements

Togolese Championnat National: 2
 1980, 1984
Coupe du Togo: 5
 1979, 1981, 1984, 1988, 1999

Performance in CAF competitions
 African Cup of Champions Clubs: 2 appearances
1981: Second Round
1985: First Round

CAF Cup: 1 appearance
1995 – Quarter-Finals

CAF Cup Winners' Cup: 7 appearances
1980 – Quarter-Finals
1982 – First Round
1983 – Finalist
1984 – Second Round
1994 – Semi-Finals
1998 – First Round
2000 – First Round

Former players
 Jean-Paul Abalo
 Emmanuel Adebayor
 Komlan Amewou
 Bachirou Salou
 Tadjou Salou

References 

Football clubs in Togo
Football clubs in Lomé